Elections to Angus Council were held on 6 April 1995, the same day as the other Scottish local government elections.

Election results

Ward results

References

1995 Scottish local elections
1995